A polysyllogism (also called multi-premise syllogism, sorites, climax, or gradatio) is a string of any number of propositions forming together a sequence of syllogisms such that the conclusion of each syllogism, together with the next proposition, is a premise for the next, and so on.  Each constituent syllogism is called a prosyllogism except the last, because the conclusion of the last syllogism is not a premise for another syllogism.

Example 

An example for a polysyllogism is:

It is raining.
If we go out while it is raining we will get wet.
If we get wet, we will get cold.
Therefore, if we go out we will get cold.

Examination of the structure of the argument reveals the following sequence of constituent (pro)syllogisms:

It is raining.
If we go out while it is raining we will get wet.
Therefore, if we go out we will get wet.

If we go out we will get wet.
If we get wet, we will get cold.
Therefore, if we go out we will get cold.

Sorites 

A sorites (plural: sorites) is a specific kind of polysyllogism in which the predicate of each proposition is the subject of the next premise. Example:

All lions are big cats.
All big cats are predators.
All predators are carnivores.
Therefore, all lions are carnivores.

Thus a sorites is a heap of propositions chained together. A sorites polysyllogism should not be confused with the sorites paradox, a.k.a. the fallacy of the heap.

Lewis Carroll uses sorites in his book  Symbolic Logic (1896). For example:

No experienced person is incompetent;
Jenkins is always blundering;
No competent person is always blundering.
Jenkins is inexperienced.

Carroll's example may be translated thus:

All experienced persons are competent persons.
No competent persons are blunderers.
Jenkins is  a blunderer.
Jenkins is not an experienced person.

See also 
 Anadiplosis - the rhetorical grounds of polysyllogism.
 Transitive relation

Notes

Bibliography
 

Term logic
Syllogism